The 1989 Challenge Tour was the inaugural season of the Challenge Tour, the official development tour to the European Tour. The tour started as the Satellite Tour with its first Order of Merit rankings in 1989 and was officially renamed as the Challenge Tour at the start of the 1990 season.

The 1989 Challenge Tour Rankings were won by England's Neal Briggs.

Challenge Tour Rankings
For full rankings, see 1989 Challenge Tour graduates.

The rankings were based on prize money won during the season, calculated in Pound sterling. The top five players on the tour earned status to play on the 1990 European Tour.

References

External links 
Official homepage of the Challenge Tour

Challenge Tour seasons
Challenge Tour